Matthew Doherty (born June 22, 1978, in Harvey, Illinois) is an American actor. He is known for his role of Lester Averman in The Mighty Ducks trilogy.

Early life and education 
Doherty is a graduate of Thornwood High School, a southern suburban high school in the Chicago area. While at Thornwood, he played trumpet in the school's band. As part of Matthew's tutoring while on the set of The Mighty Ducks, he took trumpet lessons from Los Angeles studio musicians.

He graduated with a theatre degree from Northwestern University in 1999, where he was a member of the Phi Kappa Sigma fraternity.

Career 
He is best known for playing the roles of Lester Averman in The Mighty Ducks trilogy (although in D1 he is referred to as Dave Averman) and William "Heed" MacKenzie in So I Married An Axe Murderer.

Doherty had a role on the TV series Boston Public, in which he shared the screen with Northwestern alum Jeri Ryan. He did a commercial in which he parodied the sound-effect featured on The Six Million Dollar Man. He is then corrected by Lee Majors, who played the title character.
Doherty is also set to return to the screen, alongside The Mighty Ducks co-star Emilio Estevez once again as Lester Averman, in the Disney+ serial reboot of the movies, The Mighty Ducks: Game Changers.

Filmography

Film

Television

References

External links
 

American male television actors
American male film actors
American male child actors
Male actors from Illinois
People from Harvey, Illinois
Northwestern University School of Communication alumni
Living people
1978 births